The Boston University Medical Campus (BUMC) is one of the three campuses of Boston University, the others being the Charles River Campus and the Fenway Campus.  The campus is situated in the South End neighborhood of Boston, Massachusetts, United States.  In conjunction with the Charles River Campus, BUMC provides the Boston University Shuttle (BUS) to transport students, staff, and faculty between campuses.  The current provost of BUMC is Karen H. Antman.

Schools 
School of Medicine
Division of Graduate Medical Sciences
School of Public Health
Goldman School of Dental Medicine

Research institutes and centers 
Alzheimer's Disease Center
Amyloid Treatment & Research Center
Behavioral Development & Mental Retardation, Center for
Boston University Area Health Education Center
Cancer Research Center
Cardiovascular Proteomics Center
Cell & Molecular Biology Program
Genetics Program
Hearing Research Center
Human Genetics, Center for
International Health, Center for
NeuroMuscular Research Center
New England & Regional Spinal Cord Injury Center
Primary Care, Center for
Pulmonary Center
Pulmonary Hypertension Center
Sexual Medicine, Institute of
Sickle Cell Disease, Center of Excellence In
Vitamin D Research Center
Whitaker Cardiovascular Institute
Women's Health Interdisciplinary Research Center

Other departments 
Alumni Medical Library

Public Safety Department 
The BUMC Public Safety Department employees about 125 public safety officers who are charged with ensuring the safety and security of all patients, staff, students, and visitors within and around the medical center grounds.  Public Safety officers provide motorist assistance, lost and found, and night escort service for the campus.  Although not a police department, many  of the officers have arrest powers as Special State Police Officers. Officers on campus respond to high-stress and emergency situations on a daily basis and make frequent arrests of violators within and around the campus. The public safety department conducts investigations for violations of University and/or Hospital policies and procedures, and suspected criminal acts.  This department is a separate entity from the Boston University Police Department.

See also 

Boston Medical Center: affiliated with, but not a part of, Boston University
Boston University School of Medicine

External links 
Boston University Medical Campus
BUMC Map
BUMC Public Safety

 
Medical Campus
1848 establishments in Massachusetts